Danny Ray Thompson (October 1, 1947 – March 12, 2020) was an American jazz musician. He played baritone saxophone with the Sun Ra Arkestra and managed the band for a period of time.

Early life
Thompson was born in New York City, to Elgie and Oscar Leonard Thompson. Soon his family moved to Los Angeles, California but after high school Thompson returned to New York City and attended night classes at Juilliard School.

Career
Thompson's first concert was with Babatunde Olatunji and after meeting Marshall Allen, Thompson was introduced to Sun Ra. The first Arkestra album Thompson appeared on was 1967's Atlantis. He made his first live appearance with the Arkestra in April, 1968 at Carnegie Hall.

Thompson, along with fellow Arkestra members Marshall Allen and Charles Davis, was present for a 100th birthday celebration for Sun Ra at the Berklee College of Music in 2014.

References

1947 births
2020 deaths
Musicians from New York City
American jazz baritone saxophonists
African-American jazz musicians
Sun Ra Arkestra members
20th-century African-American musicians
20th-century American musicians
20th-century saxophonists
Jazz musicians from New York (state)
21st-century African-American people